Enzo Mirigliani (22 April 1917 – 26 September 2011) was an Italian television personality and the head of the Miss Italy beauty pageant for over 50 years.

Born in Santa Caterina dello Ionio in Calabria, Italy, Mirigliani became the head of Miss Italy in 1959. Over the years, he created many other shows. He stepped down as head of Miss Italy in 2010, and died the following year at the Gemelli Clinic in Rome, aged 94. He was Commander in the Order of Merit of the Italian Republic.

References 

1917 births
2011 deaths
People from Calabria
People from the Province of Catanzaro
Italian television personalities